Sarahsville may refer to:
Sarahsville, former name of Bath, California
Sarahsville, former name of Clinton, California
Sarahsville, Ohio